Cheyniana is a  genus of flowering plants in the family Myrtaceae. Two species are currently recognised, both endemic to Western Australia:

Cheyniana microphylla (C.A.Gardner) Rye (basionym Balaustion microphyllum) - Bush pomegranate
Cheyniana rhodella Rye & Trudgen (syn. Baeckea sp. Mullewa-Morawa)

References

Myrtaceae
Myrtaceae genera
Myrtales of Australia
Taxa named by Barbara Lynette Rye
Endemic flora of Southwest Australia